Russian football club Torpedo Moscow has taken part in many European competitions since the 1960s, including the European Cup, the UEFA Cup Winners' Cup, the UEFA Cup, and the UEFA Intertoto Cup. 

The furthest the club has gone in a European competition was reaching the quarter-finals of the 1990–91 UEFA Cup, beating GAIS, Sevilla, and AS Monaco, before losing to Brondby on penalties. The club has participated in European competitions 20 times, with the first coming in the 1966–67 European Cup and the last in the 2003–04 UEFA Cup.

External links
 Наши в еврокубках

FC Torpedo Moscow
Torpedo Moscow
Soviet football clubs in international competitions